Sragen Regency is a regency in the eastern part of Central Java province in Indonesia. It covers an area of 941.56 km2 and had a population of 858,266 at the 2010 Census and 976,951 at the 2020 Census. Its capital is the town of Sragen, located about 30 km to the northeast of Surakarta. Sragen is bordered by East Java Province to the east.

Java's longest river, the Bengawan Solo River, flows through the fertile rice fields in the region. The archaeological excavation and UNESCO World Heritage Site Sangiran is located in Sragen.

Administrative Districts
Sragen Regency comprises twenty districts (kecamatan), tabulated below with their areas and their populations at the 2010 Census and the 2020 Census. The table also includes the number of administrative villages (rural desa and urban kelurahan) in each district and its post code.

Climate
Sragen has a tropical monsoon climate (Am) with moderate to little rainfall from June to September and heavy rainfall from October to May.

References

External links 

 

Regencies of Central Java
Solo River